Vernon Stephens may refer to:
Vern Stephens (1920–1968), American baseball player
Vernon Stephens (politician), American politician